Rinat Kedem (born 5 December 1965) is an American mathematician and mathematical physicist.

Kedem graduated in 1988	with BA in physics from Macalester College. She received her PhD in physics in 1993 from Stony Brook University (the State University of New York at Stony Brook) with thesis advisor Barry M. McCoy. She was a postdoc from 1993 to 1995 at Kyoto University's Research Institute for Mathematical Sciences (RIMS), from 1995 to 1996 at the University of Melbourne, and from 1996 to 1997 at the University of California, Berkeley. At the University of Massachusetts Amherst, she was an assistant professor of mathematics from 1997 to 2001. In the mathematics department of the University of Illinois at Urbana-Champaign, she was from 2001 to 2006 an assistant professor and from 2006 to 2012 an associate professor and is since 2012 a full professor.

Kedem's research deals with mathematical physics, Lie algebras, integrable models, and cluster algebras. In 2014 she was an invited speaker with talk Fermionic spectra in integrable systems at the International Congress of Mathematicians in Seoul. She was a plenary speaker in 2012 at the 24th International Conference on Formal Power Series and Algebraic Combinatorics in Nagoya and in 2019 at the 11th International Symposium on Quantum Theory and Symmetries (QTS2019) in Montreal. For the academic year 2019–2020 she was awarded a Simons Fellowship.

Selected publications

References

External links

1965 births
Living people
Macalester College alumni
Stony Brook University alumni
University of Massachusetts Amherst faculty
University of Illinois Urbana-Champaign faculty
20th-century American mathematicians
21st-century American mathematicians
American women mathematicians
American women physicists
20th-century women mathematicians
21st-century women mathematicians
20th-century American women
21st-century American women